Vahlkampfiidae is a family of Heterolobosea.

It includes the following genera:
 Monopylocystis
 Naegleria
 Neovahlkampfia
 Paravahlkampfia
 Psalteriomonas
 Sawyeria
 Tetramitus
 Vahlkampfia
 Willaertia

See also
Gruberellidae

References

Further reading

Percolozoa
Excavata families